Meritxell or Maria de Meritxell, or informally Txell, is a feminine given name referring to Our Lady of Meritxell, patron saint of Andorra. It is common in Andorra and frequent in Catalonia. Notable people with the name include:

 Meritxell Batet (born 1973), Spanish politician
 Meritxell Borràs (born 1964), Spanish politician
 Meritxell Budó (born 1969), Spanish politician
 Meritxell Colell Aparicio (born 1983), Spanish director
 Meritxell Mas (born 1994), Spanish synchronized swimmer
 Meritxell Mateu i Pi (born 1966), Andorran politician
 Meritxell Negre (1971–2020), Spanish singer-songwriter
 Meritxell Sabate (born 1980), Andorran swimmer
 Meritxell Serret (born 1975), Spanish politician

Catalan feminine given names